Sir Francis Henry Goldsmid, 2nd Baronet (1 May 1808 – 2 May 1878) was an English lawyer and politician.

Early life
The son of Sir Isaac Lyon Goldsmid and a member of the Goldsmid banking family, Francis was born in London, and privately educated.

Career
Goldsmid was called to the bar at Lincoln's Inn in 1833, becoming the first Jew to become an English barrister, and was made Queen's Counsel in 1858. In 1859 he succeeded to his father's honors. After the passing of the Jewish Disabilities Bill, in which he had aided his father with a number of pamphlets that attracted great attention, he entered Parliament in 1860 as member for the Reading constituency, and represented that constituency until his death.

Goldsmid was strenuous on behalf of the Jewish religion, and the founder of the great Jews Free School. He was a munificent contributor to charities and especially to the endowment of University College London. He married Louisa Goldsmid who was his cousin. His wife was a campaigner for women's education. He employed the author and translator Frederica Maclean Rowan as his secretary for some years.

Marriage
He married his first cousin Louisa Sophia Goldsmid on 10 October 1839 at London, England. His nephew was Sir Julian Goldsmid.

Death and legacy
Sir Francis Henry Goldsmid 2nd Bt., died dsp on 2 May 1878 in St. Thomas's Hospital London following an accident that day when he fell between the platform and a carriage from which he was alighting at Waterloo Station.
He was succeeded in the baronetcy by his nephew Sir Julian Goldsmid, son of Frederick Goldsmid. Goldsmid Road in the town of Reading is named after Francis Goldsmid, and is the location of the town's Orthodox synagogue.

References

External links 

Jewish Encyclopedia entry for Francis Henry Goldsmid

1808 births
1878 deaths
English philanthropists
English Jews
English people of Dutch-Jewish descent
Liberal Party (UK) MPs for English constituencies
Members of the Parliament of the United Kingdom for Reading
People from Reading, Berkshire
UK MPs 1859–1865
UK MPs 1865–1868
UK MPs 1868–1874
UK MPs 1874–1880
Baronets in the Baronetage of the United Kingdom
19th-century King's Counsel
Members of Lincoln's Inn
Jewish British politicians
Francis
Committee members of the Society for the Diffusion of Useful Knowledge